"You're Gonna Love This" is the first single from 3OH!3's fourth studio album Omens. It was released digitally on 10 July 2012.

Background
The song is energetic and utilizes autotune, reminiscent of their 2009 hit "Don't Trust Me". In contrast to that song's reference to Helen Keller, You're Gonna Love This includes the lyric “the girl was biting on my lips like Jeffrey Dahmer.” The song mentions picking up a girl at the bar and how the night goes on from there with the duo singing “I’ll buy you a round, if you come close, Turn up the sound, turn the lights down, Give me a chance, I will take her home with me.”

Artwork
The artwork for You're Gonna Love This appears to be divided into 4 triangular sections. The bottom section is seen to be a pyramid with a river running through it, whilst in the centre of the artwork an eye template is featured with the 3OH!3 logo in the middle. The title "You're Gonna Love This" is below, with the single's album title: Omens featured above the eye and logo and below a triangle. There have been many speculations that the single is showing sign's supposedly from the Illuminati, including the Eye of Horus, and a hierarchal pyramid.

Music video
A video for the song was released on Aug 15 2012 on The Warner Sound's YouTube channel.

Synopsis
The video opens with one of the band's members next to a girl at Planet Hollywood. She's married, and hides her ring when he starts hitting her up. Then the second guy walks up and hits on her, and this means war.
Both of the men do trick shots throughout the video to win back the girl, including a soccer ball down an escalator. While the trio were going down the adjacent escalator, the soccer ball from earlier was still there. At the end of the video, he throws a ball down to the pool from the roof of the building, but the other man throws another one from higher up in a helicopter, and the video shows another man approach her, who looks like Tom Cruise in Risky Business. She leaves with him. After the song ends, the video cuts to the same escalator where the ball remained.

Chart performance

Release history

References

2012 songs
2012 singles
3OH!3 songs
Songs written by Nathaniel Motte
Songs written by Sean Foreman